Erwin Nijboer (born 2 June 1964) is a former Dutch racing cyclist. He rode in seventeen Grand Tours between 1986 and 1996.

Major results
Sources:
1986
 7th Klasika Primavera
1989
 1st Stage 3a TTT Vuelta a España
 7th TTT Grand Prix de la Libération
1990
 1st Overall Driedaagse van De Panne-Koksijde
 1st Stage 4 Vuelta a España
1992
 1st Sprint classification Vuelta a Aragón
 2nd Porto–Lisboa
1993
 1st Stage 5b Vuelta a Murcia
 9th Vuelta a los Valles Mineros

References

External links

1964 births
Living people
Dutch male cyclists
People from Denekamp
Cyclists from Overijssel